Jamaica participated in the 2011 Parapan American Games.

Medalists

Athletics

Jamaica sent five male athletes and one female athlete to compete.

Nations at the 2011 Parapan American Games
2011 in Jamaican sport
Jamaica at the Pan American Games